The pocket shark (Mollisquama parini) is a species of kitefin shark in the family Dalatiidae. The species is found in deep water off Chile in the southeastern Pacific Ocean. It was the only member of the genus Mollisquama, until another species, M. mississippiensis, was discovered in the Gulf of Mexico. Both species are distinguished from other sharks by two pockets next to the front fins. The pockets are large, measuring about 4% of the shark's body length. Some researchers hypothesize that the pockets may excrete some kind of glowing fluid or pheromones.

Etymology
The specific name, parini, is in honor of Russian ichthyologist Nikolai Vasilevich Parin (born 1932).

Distribution and habitat
The first specimen of M. parini was found off the coast of Chile in the Nazca Submarine Ridge. This initially suggested that the species was distributed throughout the Pacific Ocean. This second specimen was determined to be a new species which was described and named as M. mississippiensis. It is now believed that the genus Mollisquama is more widely dispersed than previously hypothesized.

Description
Sharks of the family Dalatiidae are small-sized to medium-sized, with two spineless dorsal fins. They are described as having strong jaws with dagger-like upper teeth and wider blade-like teeth in the lower jaw. From the one finding of the pocket shark in the Gulf of Mexico (M. mississippiensis), the mouth was described to have a rectangular-like opening on the underside of the body. The overall shape of the shark is cylindrical, with a wide, rounded snout tapering back toward the caudal fin.

Pocket gland
The pocket shark, Mollisquama parini, gets its common name from a small pocket gland that is found behind each pectoral fin on either side of the shark. The purpose of this gland is still unknown as not enough specimens have been found to investigate the matter. The closest suggestion for the purpose of this gland is to act as a luminous pouch as found on the species Euprotomicroides zantedeschia. While this pocket gland appears to have a slightly darker gray coloration, the rest of the shark's body is described to be a light gray with brown undertones.

Environmental threats and conservation
There is essentially no interaction of M. parini with humans, so the species does not seem to cause any threat to the environment and other species, including humans. No methods of conservation are in place to protect this species as population numbers are unknown.

References

Further reading
Dolganov VN (1984). "[New shark from family Squalidae caught on Naska Submarine Ridge]". Zoologicheskii zhurnal 63: 1589-1591. (Mollisquama, new genus; Mollisquama parini, new species). (in Russian).

External links
NOAA and Tulane researchers identify second possible specimen ever found

Dalatiidae

Fish described in 1984
Species known from a single specimen